The Sleeping Gypsy  (French: La Bohémienne endormie) is an 1897 oil painting by French Naïve artist Henri Rousseau (1844–1910). It is a fantastical depiction of a lion musing over a sleeping woman on a moonlit night.

Rousseau first exhibited the painting at the 13th Salon des Indépendants, and tried unsuccessfully to sell it to the mayor of his hometown, Laval. Instead, it entered the private collection of a Parisian charcoal merchant where it remained until 1924, when it was discovered by the art critic Louis Vauxcelles.  The Paris-based art dealer Daniel-Henry Kahnweiler purchased the painting in 1924, although a controversy arose over whether the painting was a forgery. It was acquired by art historian Alfred H. Barr Jr. for the New York Museum of Modern Art.

Description
Rousseau described his painting as follows: "A wandering Negress, a mandolin player, lies with her jar beside her (a vase with drinking water), overcome by fatigue in a deep sleep. A lion chances to pass by, picks up her scent yet does not devour her. There is a moonlight effect, very poetic."

Popular culture references

 A print of the work appears in the movie The Apartment (1960) above the comatose Fran Kubelik.
 The painting has served as inspiration for poetry and music, and has been altered and parodied by various artists often with the lion replaced by a dog or other animal. In the Simpsons episode "Mom and Pop Art" (1999), Homer dreams of waking up in the artwork with the lion licking his head.
  The painting is seen in the house of Dr. Robert Neville in I Am Legend (2007), after being taken from the MoMA when New York City was abandoned. The painting is ultimately destroyed when his house blows up.
 This painting appears in the episode of Madeline "Madeline At The Louvre" where Madeline sees herself as the gypsy who sleeps in the painting. 
 The painting is referenced in Angela Carter's The Passion of New Eve to describe the fatigued stillness of the eponymous protagonist (London: Virago, 1982), p.161.
 The painting is referenced in William Saroyan's "Tracy's Tiger." (1951)
 The painting is also shown in the Between the Lions episode Art Party where the cubs talk about the sleeping gypsy in the beginning, middle, and end. (2003)

References

External links

The Sleeping Gypsy MoMA Provenance Research
The Sleeping Gypsy-an artists Interpretation 

Modern paintings
1897 paintings
Paintings by Henri Rousseau
Paintings in the collection of the Museum of Modern Art (New York City)
Lions in art
Musical instruments in art
Moon in art